Bouley is a French surname.

List of people with the surname 

 Bernard Bouley (born 1950), French politician
 David Bouley (born 1953), American chef

See also 

 Bosley (surname)
 Boulet (surname)
 Bouley
 Bouley Bay
 Bouley Bay Hill Climb

French-language surnames
Surnames of French origin